Bedevostan-e Sharqi Rural District is in the Central District of Heris County, East Azerbaijan province, Iran. At the National Census of 2006, its population was 5,729 in 1,311 households. There were 5,948 inhabitants in 1,551 households at the following census of 2011. At the most recent census of 2016, the population of the rural district was 5,984 in 1,808 households. The largest of its 13 villages was Namrur, with 1,424 people.

References 

Heris County

Rural Districts of East Azerbaijan Province

Populated places in East Azerbaijan Province

Populated places in Heris County